Podhomara  (Cyrillic: Подхомара) is a village in the municipalities of Novo Goražde, Republika Srpska and Goražde, Bosnia and Herzegovina.

Demographics 
According to the 2013 census, its population was nil, down from 63 in 1991.

References

Populated places in Novo Goražde
Populated places in Goražde